The Oregon State Soldier's Home Hospital, now known as the Umpqua Arts Center, is a former old soldiers' home in Roseburg, Oregon. The building is listed on the National Register of Historic Places.

See also
 National Register of Historic Places listings in Douglas County, Oregon

References

External links
 Historic buildings—beautiful to view, costly to heat and cool

Arts centers in Oregon
Buildings and structures in Roseburg, Oregon
National Register of Historic Places in Douglas County, Oregon